Eadhild (died 937) was an English princess, the second wife of Hugh, duke of the Franks. She was a daughter of Edward the Elder, king of the Anglo-Saxons and his second wife Ælfflæd.

In 926 Edward's son, king Æthelstan, received an embassy from his cousin, Adelolf, Count of Boulogne, on behalf of Hugh, and Æthelstan agreed to give his half-sister, Eadhild, in marriage in return for an enormous quantity of gifts and relics. According to William of Malmesbury, these included spices, jewels, many swift horses, an elaborate onyx vase, a crown of solid gold, the sword of Constantine the Great, Charlemagne's lance and a piece of the Crown of Thorns. Eadhild's full sister, Eadgifu, was the wife of the deposed king of the West Franks, Charles the Simple. Hugh was a potential rival for the Frankish throne, and Eadgifu may have promoted the marriage in order to sever a dangerous link between Hugh and Count Herbert of Vermandois.

Eadhild died childless in 937.

Citations

Sources

External links
 

937 deaths
10th-century English people
10th-century English women
Year of birth unknown
House of Wessex
English princesses
Daughters of kings